Kölpinsee is a lake in the Mecklenburgische Seenplatte district in Mecklenburg-Vorpommern, Germany.

The marshy shore of the lake was the probable site of the crash of Avro Lancaster Flight DV202 in August 1943.

References

External links 
 

Lakes of Mecklenburg-Western Pomerania
Federal waterways in Germany